The Seoul Accord is an international accreditation agreement for professional computing and information technology academic degrees, between the bodies responsible for accreditation in its signatory countries. Established in 2008, the signatories as of 2016 are Australia, Canada, Taiwan, Hong Kong, Japan, Korea, the United Kingdom and the United States. Provisional signatories include Ireland, New Zealand, Mexico, Philippines , Sri Lanka and Malaysia. 

This agreement mutually recognizes tertiary level computing and IT qualifications between the signatory agencies. Graduates of accredited programs in any of the signatory countries are recognized by the other signatory countries as having met the academic requirements as IT professionals.

Scope
The Seoul Accord covers tertiary undergraduate computing degrees. Engineering and Engineering Technology programs are not covered by the Seoul accord, although some Software engineering programs have dual accreditation with the Washington Accord.

Signatories
The following are the signatory accreditation bodies of the Seoul Accord, their respective countries and territories, and years of admission:
 Australia - (Australian Computer Society, 2008)
 Canada - (Canadian Information Processing Society, 2008)
 Taiwan - (Institute of Engineering Education Taiwan, 2008) 
 Hong Kong  - (The Hong Kong Institution of Engineers, 2008)
 Japan - (JABEE, 2008)
 Korea - (Accreditation Board for Engineering Education of Korea, 2008)
 United Kingdom - (British Computer Society, 2008)
 United States - (ABET, 2008)
 Mexico - (Consejo Nacional de Acreditación en Informática y Computación, A. C. (CONAIC) - 2021)

The following are Provisional Signatories of the Seoul Accord, along with their respective countries and territories and years of admission:
 Ireland - (Engineers Ireland, 2015)
 New Zealand - (Institute of IT Professionals, 2015)
 Philippines - (The Philippine Information and Computing Accreditation Board, 2015)
 Sri Lanka - (The Computer Society of Sri Lanka, 2018)
 Malaysia - (Malaysia Board of Technologists, 2019)
 Indonesia - (Indonesian Accreditation Board for Engineering Education (IABEE), 2022?)
 Ireland - Engineers Ireland (EI)
 Saudi Arabia - Education and Training Evaluation Commission (ETEC)- National Center of Academic and Evaluation (NCAA)

See also
 Sydney Accord - engineering technologists
 Dublin Accord - engineering technicians
 EQANIE - european accreditation 
 Chartered Engineer
 Outcome-based education
 Professional Engineer

References

External links
 Seoul Accord

Professional titles and certifications
Information technology education
Computer science education
Computer science organizations